"Seven Seas" is a single by Echo & the Bunnymen which was released on 6 July 1984. It was the third single to be released from their 1984 album Ocean Rain. It reached number 16 on the UK Singles Chart and number 10 on the Irish Singles Chart.

In a retrospective review of the song, Allmusic journalist Dave Thompson said: "Regardless of the surreal lyrics, their enigmatic meaning dovetails marvelously with the mood of this exquisite piece."

Overview
The single was released as a 7-inch single and a 12-inch single. The A-side of the 7-inch single was the title track, "Seven Seas", and the B-side was a live cover version of The Beatles' song "All You Need Is Love". The A-side of the 12-inch single consisted of the title track and "All You Need Is Love". The B-side consisted of "The Killing Moon", "Stars Are Stars" and "Villiers Terrace".

"All You Need Is Love", "The Killing Moon", "Stars Are Stars" and "Villiers Terrace" were recorded live at Liverpool Cathedral for the Channel 4 programme Play at Home.

A numbered limited edition 7-inch EP was also available on two discs, with all the tracks of the 12-inch single release and with the added title on the cover of Life at Brian's – Lean and Hungry.

American indie rock group Velocity Girl released a cover version of "Seven Seas" as a single on Heaven Records in 1995.

Track listings
All tracks written by Will Sergeant, Ian McCulloch, Les Pattinson and Pete de Freitas unless otherwise noted.

7-inch single (Korova KOW 35, WEA 249 321-7)
"Seven Seas" – 3:19
"All You Need Is Love" (Lennon–McCartney) – 6:41

12-inch single (Korova KOW 35T, WEA 249 320-0) and 7-inch EP (Korova KOW 35F)
"Seven Seas" – 3:19
"All You Need Is Love" (Lennon–McCartney) – 6:41
"The Killing Moon" – 3:17
"Stars Are Stars" – 3:05
"Villiers Terrace" – 6:52

Chart positions

Personnel

Musicians

Echo & the Bunnymen
Ian McCulloch – vocals, guitar
Will Sergeant – lead guitar
Les Pattinson – bass
Pete de Freitas – drums

Additional
Adam Peters – piano, cello
Tim Whittaker – bongos
Khien Luu – clarinet, alto saxophone
Alam Perman – harpsichord
James Drake-Brockman – harpsichord

Production
The Bunnymen – producer, mixed by
Gil Norton – engineer, mixed by
Henri Loustau – engineer
Jean-Yves – assistant engineer
Adam Peters – orchestral arrangement
Anton Corbijn – photography

References

External links
Lyrics at MTV.com

Songs about oceans and seas
1984 singles
1984 songs
Echo & the Bunnymen songs
Songs written by Ian McCulloch (singer)
Songs written by Will Sergeant
Songs written by Les Pattinson
Songs written by Pete de Freitas
Warner Music Group singles
Jangle pop songs
Music videos directed by Anton Corbijn